Dorsa Barlow is a wrinkle ridge system on the Moon, in Mare Tranquilitatis near the border with Mare Serenitatis, centered at . It is about 110 km long and was named after British crystallographer William Barlow in 1976.

References

 Map of the region

External links
Dorsa Barlow at The Moon Wiki

Barlow